Cham Rud Rural District is a rural district (dehestan) in Bagh-e Bahadoran District, Lenjan County, Isfahan Province, Iran. At the 2006 census, its population was 8,422, in 2,178 families.  The rural district has 16 villages.

References 

Rural Districts of Isfahan Province
Lenjan County